Thomas Francis Stankard  (1882–1958), was an American football and baseball player.  He played college football and baseball at College of Holy Cross.  In 1903, he compiled a .412 batting average for the Holy Cross baseball team and was selected by Walter Camp as a third-team halfback on his 1903 College Football All-America Team. In July 1904, he appeared in two games in Major League Baseball with the Pittsburgh Pirates, compiling no hits in two plate appearances. He also played 11 seasons and more than 1,000 games as a first and second baseman in minor league baseball from 1904 to 1914, including stints with the Springfield Ponies (1906–08, 1913–14), Denver Grizzlies (1909) and Holyoke Papermakers (1912).

References

1882 births
1958 deaths
Major League Baseball infielders
Baseball players from Massachusetts
Pittsburgh Pirates players
Jersey City Skeeters players
Springfield Ponies players
Denver Grizzlies (baseball) players
Brockton Shoemakers players
New Britain Perfectos players
Waterbury Champs players
Holyoke Papermakers players
Meriden Hopes players
Players of American football from Massachusetts
Montpelier-Barre players